Uwharrie may refer to several geographical features in North Carolina in the United States:

Uwharrie Mountains
Uwharrie National Forest
Uwharrie River
Uwharrie Lakes Region